DJ Wich is a Czech DJ and music producer who works on the Czech and Slovak hip hop scenes. He started DJing in 1998.

Career 
DJ Wich released his first solo album, Time Is Now, in 2004, the first producer album in Czech.

In 2008, DJ Wich released his second solo album, The Golden Touch with international stars including Lil Wayne, Talib Kweli, M.O.P, and Kurupt.

His 2010 album Human Writes was a collaboration with Hi-Def.

In 2017 he released Veni, Vidi, Wich.

He has collaborated with Czech artists including Orion, Hugo Toxxx, Vladimir 518, LA4 and from the international Rasco, Rytmus, H16, Vec, and Nironic.

Wich streams live shows on DJ Wich Live TV with other rappers, live recording, interviews and chat.

DJ Wich created the soundtrack for the 2008 Czech movie Ulovit miliardáře.

Awards 

 2001 – Anděl Award – DJ of the year
 2002 – Dance Music Awards – My3 – Best album of the year
 2004 – Music awards of Óčko – Time Is Now – Best Hip Hop/RnB album of the year
 2004, 2005, 2006, 2007, 2008 – Ladder Music Awards – DJ of the year

Discography 
 2001 - Indy & Wich – Cesta Štrýtu
 2002 - Indy & Wich – My3
 2003 - Indy & Wich - Ještě pořád
 2004 - DJ Wich – Time Is Now
 2004 - DJ Wich – Work Affair Mixtape
 2006 - Indy & Wich – Hádej Kdo…
 2007 - DJ Wich presents Nironic: The Chronicles of a Nomad
 2008 - DJ Wich – The Yearbook Mixtape
 2008 - DJ Wich – The Golden Touch
 2009 - Hi-Def & DJ Wich – Human Writes
 2010 - DJ Wich feat Rasco - The Untouchables: Al Capone's Vault
 2011 - DJ Wich & Nironic - Nomad 2: The Long Way Home
 2012 - DJ Wich & Ektor - Tetris
 2014 - LA4 & DJ Wich - Panorama
 2017 - DJ Wich - Veni, Vidi, Wich
 2018 - Lvcas Dope & Dj Wich - Diamant
 2020 - Paulie Garand & Dj Wich - Mezi prsty

References

Living people
Czech hip hop musicians
1978 births